Was willst du noch?! is the fourth studio album by German singer Alexander Klaws. It was released by Edel Music on Cruiser Entertainment on 4 April 2008 in German-speaking Europe.

Track listing

Charts

References

2006 albums
Alexander Klaws albums
German-language albums